Rep, REP, or a variant may refer to:

As a word
 Rep (fabric), a ribbed woven fabric made from various materials
 Rep (TV series), a 1982 British comedy series
 The Rep, an entertainment guide published by the Arizona Republic 1997–2006
 Johnny Rep (born 1951), Dutch footballer

Abbreviation and acronyms
 Reasonable expectation of privacy, a legal test in US constitutional law
 Rede dos Emissores Portugueses, an amateur radio organization in Portugal
 Régiment Étranger de Parachutistes, or 1st Foreign Parachute Regiment, a French Foreign Legion unit
 Remedial education program, a type of instructional program
 Repertory theatre
 Repertory Philippines
 Repetition (disambiguation)
 Representative (disambiguation)
 Republic
 Republicans for Environmental Protection, a US Republican Party organization
 Reputation
 Resident Evil Portable, a video game for the PlayStation Portable in the Resident Evil franchise
 Retail Electricity Provider, in electricity retailing in the United States
 Routledge Encyclopedia of Philosophy
 The Republicans (Germany), a political party in Germany
 Siem Reap International Airport (IATA code), in Cambodia
 Repertories (archival records) of the Court of Aldermen of the City of London, used in footnotes

In science and engineering
 Rab escort protein
 Radioisotope electric propulsion, a proposed use for radioisotope thermoelectric generators
 Reuse-release Equivalence Principle, a principle of object-oriented design
 REP, an x86 assembly language instruction (abbreviation of repeat)
 REP, a French aircraft and aero engine manufacturer owned by Robert Esnault-Pelterie
 Robots exclusion protocol, or robots exclusion standard, a website communications standard
 Röntgen equivalent physical, a unit of exposure to radiation